Grande, grosso e... Verdone is a 2008 Italian comedy film directed by Carlo Verdone.

Plot 
Carlo Verdone once again plays three characters from his comic repertoire: the naive boy, the logor teacher, and the Roman "cafone".
In the first episode, Leo is desperate for his mother's sudden death, and experiences various vicissitudes to organize funeral and burial. At the end of the story Leo discovers with the family that the funeral company, cremating the mother's body, has exchanged the urn with that of a motorcyclist!

In the second episode, the striking Professor Callisto has a possessive relationship with the timid son who never had a girl, and decides to take as a "maid" a college girl to bring about a good relationship of friendship between her and his son. But his son wants to rebel against the father, and abandons him during an excursion to the catacombs of Rome.

In the last story, the vulgar Moreno goes with his family of cafes in a luxury hotel in Taormina, generating the general disapproval of other customers. Moreno between them sees a beautiful girl who tries to conquer in all the ways, eventually discovering she is an escort.

Cast 
 Carlo Verdone - Leo Nuvolone / Callisto Cagnato / Moreno Vecchiarutti / L'onorevole
 Claudia Gerini - Enza Sessa
 Eva Riccobono - Blanche Duvall
 Geppi Cucciari - Tecla
 Emanuele Propizio - Steven Vecchiarutti
  - Severiano Cagnato
  - Lucilla Diotiallevi
  - Otello
 Roberto Farnesi - Fabio Muso

References

External links 

2008 comedy films
2008 films
Italian comedy films
Films directed by Carlo Verdone
2000s Italian-language films